Michael Joseph Curley (October 12, 1879 – May 16, 1947) was an Irish-born prelate of the Roman Catholic Church who served as the first archbishop of the Archdiocese of Washington (1939–1947).  He served as the tenth archbishop of the Archdiocese of Baltimore in Maryland (1921–1947) and as bishop of the Diocese of St. Augustine in Florida (1914–1921).

Biography

Early life and education 
One of eleven children, Michael Curley was born on October 12, 1879, in Athlone, County Westmeath, Ireland to Michael and Maria (née Ward) Curley. He attended primary school in Athlone that was run by the Marist Brothers. At age 16, Curley entered Mungret College in Limerick, Ireland. While at Mungret, Curley wanted to eventually become a missionary to the Fiji Islands.  However, after speaking with Bishop John Moore during a school visit, Curley decided instead to go to the Diocese of St. Augustine in the United States after his finished his education.

After graduating from Mungret, Curley entered the Royal University of Ireland, earning a Bachelor of Arts degree in 1900.  He then travelled to Rome to study at the Urban College of the Propaganda, receiving a Licentiate of Sacred Theology in 1903.

Priesthood 
On March 19, 1904, Curley was ordained to the priesthood for the Diocese of St. Augustine by Cardinal Pietro Respighi in the Basilica of St. John Lateran in Rome. He arrived in Florida in 1904, and was named pastor of St. Peter's Parish in DeLand, Florida.  He lived in a rented room above a store and ate in a local diner

In 1914, Curley was appointed chancellor of the diocese and secretary to Bishop William John Kenny.

Bishop of St. Augustine 

On April 3, 1914, Curley was appointed the fourth bishop of the Diocese of St. Augustine by Pope Pius X. He received his episcopal consecration on June 30, 1914, from Bishop Benjamin Keiley, with Bishops Patrick Donahue and Owen Corrigan serving as co-consecrators. At age 34, Curley was the youngest bishop in the country. He spent eight months out of every year on journeys throughout the diocese.

In 1913, the Florida Legislature had passed legislation prohibiting white women from teaching African-American children, a measure aimed at non-segregated Catholic schools.  Considering the law unconstitutional, then Bishop William John Kenny had told his teaching nuns to ignore it.  In 1916, Florida Governor Park Trammell ordered the arrest of three Sisters of St. Joseph for violating the law. Curley vigorously attacked their arrests as part of a campaign against Catholic schools, gaining strong support from other Catholic prelates in the United States.

 Curley attracted national attention in 1917 by successfully battling a bill in the Florida Legislature that would have mandated inspections of convents. Curley refused to comply with it. He led a successful legal campaign to have the law declared unconstitutional. He also sought to educate Floridians about Catholicism and demonstrate the bigotry of the Ku Klux Klan.

During World War I, Curley was a strong supporter of the war effort. In 1917, he established the Diocesan Catholic War Council, a group that gave spiritual guidance to Florida's Catholic soldiers heading off to war. He spoke at Liberty Bond rallies.  At the end of the war, Curley celebrated a large memorial mass for soldiers who died in the war at Battery Park in New York City. by the By the end of his tenure in the Diocese of St. Augustine., the Catholic population had grown from 39,000 to 41,000, with 40 new churches built.

Archbishop of Baltimore
On August 10, 1921, Curley was appointed the tenth archbishop of the Archdiocese of Baltimore by Pope Benedict XV. His installation took place on November 30, 1921. His arrival in his new city was described as "one of the greatest welcomes ever tendered a new citizen of Baltimore." During his tenure in Baltimore, Curley established 66 schools in 18 years, placing the importance of constructing schools over churches. In 1926, he declared, "I defy any system of grammar school education in the United States to prove itself superior to the system that is being maintained in the Archdiocese of Baltimore." He also established diocesan offices for Catholic Charities (1923) and for the Society for the Propagation of the Faith (1925).  During the 1920s, Curley was a frequent critic of Irish President Eamon De Valera, comparing him to the Mexican revolutionary Pancho Villa.  In March 1926, Curley criticized the expropriation of Catholic Church property by the Mexican Government and the expulsion of foreign priests and nuns:In order to preach the doctrine of Jesus Christ in Mexico, one must be a Mexican by birth. If the Savior of the world came back to Mexico, he would be exiled forthwith...because he is not a born Mexican.In 1931, Pope Pius XI appointed Curley as an assistant to the papal throne, becoming later a member of the College of Patriarchs and Bishops.  The next year, Curley celebrated the mass at the end of the Eucharistic Conference in Dublin.

Curley was a strong opponent of the foreign policy of President Franklin Roosevelt, of policies of the Spanish government that Curley called anti-clerical and of the American film industry.  He vigorously fought efforts in Baltimore to open movie theaters on Sunday.  He also criticized the establishment of Newman Centres at secular universities, which he felt undermined Catholic schools. In 1936, Curley called upon his fellow Catholic bishops to conduct a study of the influences of communism in the United States. He once engaged in a public feud with The Baltimore Sun when one of its reporters compared Adolf Hitler to Ignatius of Loyola. Although his predecessor Archbishop James Gibbons was appointed cardinal, Curley never received the same distinction.

Archbishop of Baltimore and Washington

On July 22, 1939, Pope Pius XII separated Washington, D.C., from the Archdiocese of Baltimore to form the new Archdiocese of Washington. While retaining his position as Archbishop of Baltimore, Curley was named the first Archbishop of Washington and governed the two archdioceses as a single unit.

Death and legacy 
By 1943, after an operation for a detached retina, Curley had given up his public appearances.Curley suffered from sinusitis, shingles, and high blood pressure. A series of strokes caused him to have partial paralysis and blindness. 

Michael Curley died at Bon Secours Hospital in Baltimore from a stroke on May 16, 1947, at age 67. He was buried in the Basilica of the Assumption in Baltimore. After Curley's death, the pope appointed separate archbishops for Baltimore (Francis Keough) and Washington (Patrick O'Boyle).

See also

 Catholic Church hierarchy
 Catholic Church in the United States
 Historical list of the Catholic bishops of the United States
 List of Catholic bishops of the United States
 Lists of patriarchs, archbishops, and bishops

References

External links
 
 Archbishop Curley High School Website
 Most Rev. Michael J. Curley. Archdiocese of Baltimore. Retrieved on 2016-11-19.
 Archbishops of the Modern Era (1851 - 2012). Archdiocese of Baltimore. Retrieved on 2016-11-19.
 Roman Catholic Archdiocese of Baltimore

1879 births
1947 deaths
20th-century Roman Catholic archbishops in the United States
Alumni of the Royal University of Ireland
Roman Catholic bishops of Saint Augustine
Roman Catholic archbishops of Baltimore
Burials at the Basilica of the National Shrine of the Assumption of the Blessed Virgin Mary
Irish expatriates in the United States
Religious leaders from Baltimore
People from County Westmeath
People from DeLand, Florida
Irish expatriate Roman Catholic archbishops